Thomas J. Thompson (sometimes credited as Tommy Thompson) is an American television director.

Since the early 1980s, he has also worked as a key grip, camera coordinator, technical coordinator and associate director, for numerous television series. They include Cagney & Lacey, The War at Home, All of Us, Wanda at Large, Shake It Up and Austin & Ally.

As a television director, he has directed episodes of Dave's World, The Norm Show, The Drew Carey Show and Good Luck Charlie.

References

External links

American television directors
Living people
Place of birth missing (living people)
Year of birth missing (living people)